Wiedenkeller is a Germanic surname. Notable people with the surname include:

Michael Wiedenkeller (born 1963), Swedish-Luxembourgian chess player
Tim Weed (born Timothy James Wiedenkeller in 1959), American multi-instrumentalist and singer-songwriter

Germanic-language surnames